Berl Huffman coached the Texas Tech Red Raiders basketball teams from 1935 through 1942 and the 1946–47 season. Huffman was the first head coach to coach the Red Raiders in nonconsecutive terms. Huffman compiled a 121–67 record. Under Huffman, the Red Raiders received their first postseason bid to the NAIB tournament.

1935–36

Source:

1936–37

Source:

1937–38

Source:

1938–39

Source:

1939–40

Source:

1940–41

Source:

1941–42

Source:

1946–47

Source:

References

Texas Tech Red Raiders basketball seasons